Malha is a neighborhood in southwest Jerusalem, between Pat, Ramat Denya and Kiryat Hayovel in the Valley of Rephaim. Before 1948, Malha was an Arab village known as al-Maliha.

History

Antiquity
Excavations in Malha revealed Intermediate Bronze Age domestic structures. A dig in the Rephaim Valley carried out by the Israel Antiquities Authority in the region of the Malha shopping mall and Biblical Zoo uncovered a village dating back to the Middle Bronze Age II B (1,700 – 1,800 BCE). Beneath this, remains of an earlier village were found from the Early Bronze Age IV (2,200 – 2,100 BCE).

According to the archaeologists who excavated there in 1987–1990, Malha is believed to be the site of Manahat, a Canaanite town on the northern border of the Tribe of Judah (Joshua 15:59). Remains of the village have been preserved at the Biblical Zoo.

Malha was a Georgian village in the fifth century, in the time of King Vakhtang I Gorgasali, who was canonized by the Georgian Orthodox Church.

Ottoman era

In the 1596 tax records al-Maliha, (named Maliha as-Suqra), was part of the Ottoman Empire, nahiya (subdistrict) of Jerusalem under the Liwa  of Jerusalem. It had a population of 52 Muslim households, an estimated 286 persons. The villagers paid a fixed tax rate of 33,3% on wheat, barley, and olive and fruit trees, goats and beehives; a total of 8,700 akçe. 1/3 of the revenue went to a waqf.

In 1838 it was noted by Edward Robinson as el Malihah, a Muslim village,   part of the  Beni Hasan district.

An Ottoman village list from about 1870 showed Malha with a population of 340, in 75 houses,  though the population count included men, only.

In 1883, the PEF's Survey of Western Palestine (SWP)  described the village as being of moderate size, standing high on a flat ridge. To the south was Ayn Yalu.

In 1896 the population of Malha was estimated to be about 600 persons.

British Mandate era
In the 1922 census of Palestine conducted by the British Mandate authorities, Malhah had a population 1,038,  all Muslims, increasing in the 1931 census  to 1,410; 1,402 Muslims and 8 Christians, in a total of 299 houses.

In the 1945 statistics  the population of Malha was 1,940; 1,930 Muslims and 10 Christians,  and the total land area was 6,828 dunams, according to an official land and population survey.  Of the land, a total of 2,618 dunams were plantations and irrigable land and 1,259 were for cereals, while a total of 328 dunams were built-up (urban) land.

1948
In the 1948 Arab-Israeli War, the village of al-Maliha, with a population of 2,250, was occupied as part of the battle for south Jerusalem. In the early part of the war, Al-Maliha, along with al-Qastal, Sur Baher and Deir Yassin, signed non-aggression pacts with the Haganah. On April 12, 1948, in the wake of the Deir Yassin Massacre, villagers from al Maliha, Qaluniya and Beit Iksa began to flee in panic. The Irgun attacked Malha in early morning hours of July 14, 1948. Several hours later, the Palestinian Arabs launched a counter-attack and seized one of the fortified positions. When Irgun reinforcements arrived, the Palestinians retreated and Malha was in Jewish control, but 17 Irgun fighters were killed and many wounded. The Arab inhabitants fled to Bethlehem, which remained under Jordanian control. The depopulated homes were occupied by Jewish refugees from Middle Eastern countries, mainly Iraq. Some of the land in Malha had been purchased before the establishment of the state by the Valero family, a family of Sephardi Jews that owned large amounts of property in Jerusalem and environs.

After 1948

The first Palestinian fedayeen raid in Israel took place in November 1951 in Malha when a woman, Leah Festinger, was killed by infiltrators from Shuafat, at the time part of Jordan.

Today

Under the aegis of the Jerusalem Municipality, the neighborhood was modernised and a large housing development was established on the nearby hill and its eastern slopes. At the bottom of the hill are the Malha Shopping Mall, Teddy Stadium, Pais Arena Jerusalem, Jerusalem Biblical Zoo and the Jerusalem Malha Railway Station. Malha is now considered an upscale neighborhood. Schools include a vocational high school (ORT) and an elementary school, the Shalom School. The Jerusalem Technology Park houses many companies, including some high-tech start-ups as well as international media offices. In 2019, plans were approved for the construction of 30-floor towers in the technology park. A line of the Jerusalem Light Rail is being built from Jerusalem's Central Bus Station to the Malha sports complex.

See also 

Jerusalem Malha Railway Station
Depopulated Palestinian locations in Israel

References

Bibliography

 
 
 

 

 

  (pp. 760 ff)

Khurtsilava, B. (2022). "Gurjis" from Palestine. pp. 17-39 https://www.academia.edu/83562888/BESIK_KHURTSILAVA_GURJIS_FROM_PALESTINE_TBILISI_2022_in_English_

External links
Photos of the neighborhood
Al-Maliha village at palestineremembered.com
al-Maliha, Zochrot 
Survey of Western Palestine, Map 17:   IAA, Wikimedia commons 
Al-Maliha

Neighbourhoods of Jerusalem
District of Jerusalem
Arab villages depopulated during the 1948 Arab–Israeli War